Homalanthus is a plant genus of the family Euphorbiaceae first described as a genus in 1824. It is the only genus in subtribe Carumbiinae. The genus is native to tropical Asia, Australia, and various islands in the Pacific.

When published, the generic name was spelt as "Omalanthus". Since the name comes from the ancient Greek word homalos meaning "smooth" and anthos meaning "flower", this original spelling was inconsistent with the general Greek transliteration rules, and many later authors changed it to Homalanthus. According to ICBN, Homalanthus, which can be found in its Appendix III, has now been conserved against the original Omalanthus.

Species

References 

Hippomaneae
Euphorbiaceae genera
Taxa named by Adrien-Henri de Jussieu